Olivér Tamás (born 14 April 2001) is a Hungarian professional footballer who plays for Paks.

Career statistics

.

References

2001 births
People from Zakarpattia Oblast
Living people
Hungarian footballers
Hungary youth international footballers
Hungary under-21 international footballers
Association football defenders
Fehérvár FC players
Budaörsi SC footballers
Paksi FC players
Nemzeti Bajnokság I players
Nemzeti Bajnokság II players